The black sculpin (Cottus baileyi) is a species of freshawater ray-finned fish belonging to the family Cottidae, the typical sculpins. It is endemic to the United States. Its range includes the extreme upper Clinch and Holston River systems in western Virginia and just into northeastern Tennessee.

The black sculpin was first formally described in 1961 by C. Richard Robins with its type locality given as " Middle fork of Holston River, 6 miles east-northeast of Marion, Smyth County, Virginia". Its specific name honors the ichthyologist Reeve Maclaren Bailey, recognising his contribution to the study of American freshwater fishes.

References

Cottus (fish)
Fish of the United States
Fish described in 1961
Taxa named by Charles Richard Robins